Manuel Weber  (born 28 August 1985 in Villach) is an Austrian footballer who plays for SV Rosegg.

Club career
He formerly played for FC Kärnten. He was the captain of Austria Kärnten until he signed with Sturm Graz in June 2009. In summer 2014, after five years with Sturm Graz, he moved to fellow Austrian Bundesliga side Wolfsberger AC.

References

External links

 Manuel Weber Interview

1987 births
Living people
Austrian footballers

Association football midfielders
Austria international footballers
SK Sturm Graz players
Wolfsberger AC players